Lamar Municipal Airport  is a public airport located two miles southwest of the town of Lamar, in Barton County, Missouri, United States.

It is included in the Federal Aviation Administration (FAA) National Plan of Integrated Airport Systems for 2021–2025, in which it is categorized as a local general aviation facility.

Most U.S. airports use the same three-letter location identifier for the FAA and IATA, but Lamar Municipal Airport is LLU to the FAA and has no IATA code. (IATA assigned LLU to Alluitsup Paa, Greenland).

Facilities

It has two runways, 17/35 is a concrete runway 4,000 by 75 feet (1,220 x 23 m) and 3/21 is a 2,900 by 60 feet (885 x 18 m) asphalt runway. 

For the 12-month period ending December 31, 2019 the airport had 5,320 aircraft operations, an average of 15 per day: 94% general aviation, 6% air taxi and less than 1% military. 

In February 2023, there were 16 aircraft based at this airport: 15 single-engine and 1 jet.

See also
 List of airports in Missouri

References

External links 
 

Airports in Missouri
Buildings and structures in Barton County, Missouri